Tarzan, the Ape Man may refer to

 Tarzan, a fictional character
 Tarzan the Ape Man (1932 film), with Johnny Weissmuller
 Tarzan, the Ape Man (1959 film) with Denny Miller
 Tarzan, the Ape Man (1981 film) with Richard Harris and Bo Derek

See also
 Tarzan (disambiguation)
 Apeman (disambiguation)